Sadie and Bessie Delany were two American sisters and human rights pioneers who wrote a successful book of memoirs.

For more information, see:
Sarah Louise Delany
Annie Elizabeth Delany
Having Our Say: The Delany Sisters' First 100 Years (the book)

Writing duos